Cox's Bazar link road–Laboni moure highway is a  national highway located in the district of Cox's Bazar, Chittagong Division, Bangladesh.

Background
The starting point of this road is the Link Road, from where this road runs to the west and the Cox's Bazar–Teknaf road to the south-east. This highway is the busiest road in Cox's Bazar which starts from Link Road and extends through Kolatoli, the main suburb of the city, to Jhinuk market of Laboni Point. This road with a length of 10.968 km has two lane which is 7.30 meters wide. This highway is part of the proposed Mirsarai–Teknaf Marine Drive.

Expansion
In 2018, a proposal was sent to the Planning Commission to upgrade the highway to four lanes. After several meetings on the project that year, it was finalized. On 19 February 2019, Obaidul Quader, the minister of road transport and bridges, announced that the tender for the project would soon be called. Sheikh Hasina, prime minister of the country, inaugurated the expansion project on 7 December 2022.

Route

 Link road
 Bus terminal (Larpara)
 Police lines
 Dolphin moure (Kolatoli)
 Laboni intersection
 Jhinuk market

References

Transport in Cox's Bazar
N